Microphilypnus is a genus of small fishes in the family Eleotridae native to the Amazon and Orinoco basins in South America. The bottom-dwelling Microphilypnus are typically found in shallow water among leaf-litter or partially buried in sand, and they can be very abundant in their habitat. Their small size combined with a speckled and semi-transparent appearance makes them highly cryptic. They somewhat resemble certain freshwater shrimp (Palaemonetes and Pseudopalaemon), as well as Priocharax characins, and they sometimes group together. Microphilypnus feed on tiny invertebrates.

Species
The recognized species in this genus are:
 Microphilypnus acangaquara Caires & J. L. de Figueiredo, 2011
 Microphilypnus amazonicus G. S. Myers, 1927
 Microphilypnus macrostoma G. S. Myers, 1927
 Microphilypnus tapajosensis Caires, 2013
 Microphilypnus ternetzi G. S. Myers, 1927

References

Eleotridae